Sissy: A Coming-of-Gender Story is a 2019 memoir written by Jacob Tobia.

Critical reception
The New York Times wrote "Tobia makes clear early on that this book will not be your traditional 'Transgender 101'. Even so, through evocative rhetoric, the memoir subtly educates even the most uninformed reader about the spectrum of nonbinary identities by recounting Tobia’s various coming-out experiences, their initial refuge in their Methodist faith and their gradual self-discovery and advocacy as a visible student at a Southern university."

Adaptation

In 2019, Showtime announced it would develop a half-hour show based on the memoir.

References

External links
Penguin Random House

2019 non-fiction books
Transgender autobiographies
2010s LGBT literature
American memoirs
G. P. Putnam's Sons books
LGBT literature in the United States